Major Johann Hinkel (1890 – 28 March 1943) was the German representative in Sark from 1942 until March 1943 when he was killed after he stepped on a mine in Sark.

Bibliography
 Francis Walter Falla "The Silent War" 1967, p 224
 Peter King "The Channel Islands War, 1940-1945" 1991, pp. 36, 167

1890 births
1943 deaths
German military personnel killed in World War II
Sark
Landmine victims